Turner Island is an island in the Donskiye Islands group lying  north-west of Bluff Island and  west of Breidnes Peninsula, Vestfold Hills, in Prydz Bay, Princess Elizabeth Land, Antarctica.

Discovery and naming
The island was mapped by Norwegian cartographers from aerial photos taken by the Lars Christensen Expedition, 1936–37. It was remapped by ANARE (Australian National Antarctic Research Expeditions) (1957–58) and named for P.B. Turner, a radio officer at Davis Station in 1958.

Important Bird Area
The island forms part of the Magnetic Island and nearby islands Important Bird Area (IBA), comprising Magnetic, Turner, Waterhouse, Lugg, Boyd and Bluff Islands, along with intervening islands and marine area. The site was designated an IBA by BirdLife International because it supports large colonies of Adélie penguins totalling some 29,000 breeding pairs, based on 2012 satellite imagery.

See also 
 List of Antarctic and Subantarctic islands

References

External links

Important Bird Areas of Antarctica
Penguin colonies
Islands of Princess Elizabeth Land